The 2nd Hollywood Critics Association TV Awards, presented by the Hollywood Critics Association, took place on August 13 and 14, 2022, in Los Angeles, California. It is the second award presentation. The two-night event focused on broadcast and cable awards on the first and streaming platforms on the second. Sixty categories were announced, including new categories dedicated to writing, directing, short-form and international series. The Broadcast and Cable nominations were announced on July 7, 2022. This Is Us led the nominations with 12, followed by Succession with 11. The Streaming nominations followed a few hours later. Severance also led nominations with 12, followed by Ted Lasso with 11. Channelwise, HBO led the nominations with 65, followed by Apple TV+ with 53.

Severance and The White Lotus won the most awards of the night with five total each, followed by Abbott Elementary, Better Call Saul, and Dopesick with four each.

Winners and nominees

Programs

Streaming
{| class="wikitable"
|-
| valign="top" width="50%"|
 Ted Lasso (Apple TV+) Dickinson (Apple TV+)
 Hacks (HBO Max)
 Only Murders in The Building (Hulu)
 Reservation Dogs (FX on Hulu)
 Schmigadoon! (AppleTV+)
 The Afterparty (Apple TV+)
 The Marvelous Mrs. Maisel (Prime Video)
| valign="top" width="50%"|
 Severance (Apple TV+) Loki (Disney+)
 Ozark (Netflix)
 Pachinko (Apple TV+)
 Squid Game (Netflix)
 Star Trek: Strange New Worlds (Paramount+)
 Stranger Things (Netflix)
 The Morning Show (Apple TV+)
|-
| valign="top" width="50%"|
 The Beatles: Get Back (Disney+) Bad Vegan: Fame. Fraud. Fugitives. (Netflix)
 George Carlin's American Dream (HBO Max)
 Jeen-yuhs: A Kanye Trilogy (Netflix)
 Kids in the Hall: Comedy Punks (Prime Video)
 LuLaRich (Prime Video)
 McCartney 3,2,1 (Hulu)
 Prehistoric Planet (AppleTV+)
 The World According to Jeff Goldblum (Disney+)
 What Happened, Brittany Murphy (HBO Max)
| valign="top" width="50%"|
 Lucy & Desi (Prime Video) Britney vs Spears (Netflix)
 Mary J. Blige's My Life (Prime Video)
 Olivia Rodrigo: driving home 2 u (Disney+)
 Our Father (Netflix)
 Spring Awakening: Those You've Known (HBO Max)
 The Tinder Swindler (Netflix)
 White Hot: The Rise & Fall of Abercrombie & Fitch (Netflix)
|-
| valign="top" width="50%"|
 Arcane (Netflix) Big Mouth (Netflix)
 Central Park (AppleTV+)
 Star Trek: Lower Decks (Paramount+)
 Undone (Prime Video)
 What If…? (Disney+)
| valign="top" width="50%"|
 Lizzo's Watch Out for the Big Grrrls (Prime Video) Legendary (HBO Max)
 Queer Eye (Netflix)
 RuPaul's Drag Race All Stars (Paramount+)
 Selena + Chef (HBO Max)
 Snoop & Martha's Very Tasty Halloween (Peacock)
|-
| valign="top" width="50%"|
 The Kids in the Hall (Prime Video) The Amber Ruffin Show (Peacock)
 Harry Potter 20th Anniversary: Return to Hogwarts (HBO Max)
 Murderville (Netflix)
 The Problem with Jon Stewart (AppleTV+)
 South Park: Post Covid (Paramount+)
| valign="top" width="50%"|
 Dopesick (Hulu) Maid (Netflix)
 Midnight Mass (Netflix)
 Pam & Tommy (Hulu)
 Station Eleven (HBO Max)
 The Dropout (Hulu)
 The Staircase (HBO Max)
 Under the Banner of Heaven (FX on Hulu)
|-
| colspan="2" valign="top" width="50%"|
 Chip 'n Dale: Rescue Rangers (Disney+) Fresh (Hulu)
 I Want You Back (Prime Video)
 Kimi (HBO Max)
 The Fallout (HBO Max)
 Zoey's Extraordinary Christmas (Roku)
|}

Broadcast Network / Cable
{| class="wikitable"
|-
| valign="top" width="50%"|
 Abbott Elementary (ABC) American Auto (NBC)
 Black-ish (ABC)
 Brooklyn Nine-Nine (NBC)
 Ghosts (CBS)
 Mr. Mayor (NBC)
 The Wonder Years (ABC)
 Young Rock (NBC)
| valign="top" width="50%"|
 What We Do in the Shadows (FX) Atlanta (FX)
 Barry (HBO)
 Better Things (FX)
 Curb Your Enthusiasm (HBO)
 Resident Alien (Syfy)
 The Righteous Gemstones (HBO)
 Somebody Somewhere (HBO)
|-
| valign="top" width="50%"|
 This Is Us (NBC) 9-1-1: Lone Star (Fox)
 The Cleaning Lady (Fox)
 Grey’s Anatomy (ABC)
 Kung Fu (The CW)
  Law & Order: Special Victims Unit (NBC)
 New Amsterdam (NBC)
 Superman & Lois (The CW)
| valign="top" width="50%"|
 Better Call Saul (AMC) Succession (HBO) Chucky (Syfy)
 Euphoria (HBO)
 The Gilded Age (HBO)
 Snowpiercer (TNT)
 Winning Time: The Rise of the Lakers Dynasty (HBO)
 Yellowjackets (Showtime)
|-
| valign="top" width="50%"|
 We Need to Talk About Cosby (Showtime) 30 for 30 (ESPN)
 The New York Times Presents: Controlling Britney Spears (FX)
 Janet Jackson (Lifetime)
 Shark Tank (ABC)
 The American Rescue Dog Show (ABC)
| valign="top" width="50%"|
 End of the Line: The Women of Standing Rock (Fuse) Bitchin': The Sound and Fury of Rick James (Showtime)
 Black Patriots: Heroes of the Civil War (History)
 Dean Martin: King of Cool (TCM)
 Rise Again: Tulsa and the Red Summer (National Geographic)
 Sheryl (Showtime)
|-
| valign="top" width="50%"|
 A Black Lady Sketch Show (HBO) Jimmy Kimmel Live! (ABC)
 Last Week Tonight with John Oliver (HBO)
 Real Time with Bill Maher (HBO)
 Saturday Night Live (NBC)
 The Daily Show with Trevor Noah (Comedy Central)
| valign="top" width="50%"|
 Rick and Morty (Adult Swim) Archer (FX)
 Bob’s Burgers (Fox)
 Family Guy (Fox)
 South Park (Comedy Central)
 Tuca & Bertie (Adult Swim)
|-
| valign="top" width="50%"|
 Lego Masters (Fox) America’s Got Talent (NBC)
 Holey Moley (ABC)
 Next Level Chef (Fox)
 The Masked Singer (Fox)
 The Voice (NBC)
| valign="top" width="50%"|
 RuPaul's Drag Race (VH1) Bar Rescue (Paramount Network)
 Harry Potter: Hogwarts Tournament of Houses (TBS)
 Project Runway (Bravo)
 Top Chef (Bravo)
 Wipeout (TBS)
|-
| valign="top" width="50%"|
 The White Lotus (HBO) Gaslit (Starz)
 Impeachment: American Crime Story (FX)
 Miracle Workers: Oregon Trail (TBS)
 Scenes From a Marriage (HBO)
 We Own This City (HBO) 
| valign="top" width="50%"|
 The Survivor (HBO) A Clüsterfünke Christmas (Comedy Central)
 List of a Lifetime (Lifetime)
 Ray Donovan: The Movie (Showtime)
 Reba McEntire’s Christmas in Tune (Lifetime)
 Vandal (Fuse)
|}

Miscellaneous
{| class="wikitable"
|-
| valign="top" width="50%"|
 Squid Game (Netflix) Acapulco (Apple TV+)
 Lupin (Netflix)
 Money Heist (Le Casa de Papel) (Netflix)
 Narcos: Mexico (Netflix)
 Pachinko (Apple TV+)
| valign="top" width="50%"|
 Norm Macdonald: Nothing Special (Netflix) Bo Burnham: The Inside Outtakes (YouTube)
 Jerrod Carmichael: Rothaniel (HBO)
 Jim Gaffigan: Comedy Monster (Netflix)
 Ricky Gervais: SuperNature (Netflix)
 Tig Notaro: Drawn (HBO)
|-
| valign="top" width="50%"|
 Celebrity Family Feud (ABC) Jeopardy! National College Championship (ABC)
 Name That Tune (Fox)
 Supermarket Sweep (ABC)
 The Chase (ABC)
 To Tell the Truth (ABC)
| valign="top" width="50%"|
 I Think You Should Leave with Tim Robinson (Netflix) Betsy & Irv (ESPN)
 Carpool Karaoke: The Series (Apple TV+)
 Cooper’s Bar (AMC)
 Mamas (Roku)
 State of the Union (Sundance TV)
|-
| colspan="2" valign="top" width="50%"|
 Love, Death & Robots (Netflix) The Boys Presents: Diabolical (Prime Video)
 Olaf Presents (Disney+)
 Smiling Friends (Adult Swim)
 Ted Lasso Presents: The Missing Christmas Mustache (Apple TV+)
 The Wheel of Time: Origins (Prime Video)
|}

Acting
Streaming

Broadcast Network / Cable
{| class="wikitable"
|-
| valign="top" width="50%"|
 Bill Hader – Barry as Barry Berkman (HBO) Andy Samberg – Brooklyn Nine-Nine as Jake Peralta (NBC)
 Anthony Anderson – Black-ish as Dre Johnson Sr. (ABC)
 Donald Glover – Atlanta as Earn Marks (FX)
 Kayvan Novak – What We Do in the Shadows as Nandor the Relentless (FX)
 Larry David – Curb Your Enthusiasm as Himself (HBO)
 Matt Berry – What We Do in the Shadows as Laszlo Cravensworth (FX)
 Utkarsh Ambudkar – Ghosts as Jay Arondekar (CBS)
| valign="top" width="50%"|
 Quinta Brunson – Abbott Elementary as Janine Teagues (ABC) Bridget Everett – Somebody Somewhere as Sam (HBO)
 Issa Rae – Insecure as Issa Dee (HBO)
 Jasmine Cephas Jones – Blindspotting as Ashley Rose (Starz)
 Natasia Demetriou – What We Do in the Shadows as Nadja of Antipaxos (FX)
 Pamela Adlon – Better Things as Sam Fox (FX)
 Rose McIver – Ghosts as Samantha Arondekar (CBS)
 Tracee Ellis Ross – Black-ish as Bow Johnson (ABC)
|-
| valign="top" width="50%"|
 Henry Winkler –  Barry as Gene Cousineau (HBO) Anthony Carrigan – Barry as NoHo Hank (HBO)
 Bowen Yang – Saturday Night Live as Various Characters (NBC)
 Brandon Scott Jones –  Ghosts as Captain Isaac Higgintoot (CBS)
 Brian Tyree Henry – Atlanta as Alfred "Paper Boi" Miles (FX)
 Chris Perfetti – Abbott Elementary as Jacob Hill (ABC)
 Harvey Guillén – What We Do in the Shadows as Guillermo de la Cruz (FX)
 Tyler James Williams – Abbott Elementary as Gregory Eddie (ABC)
| valign="top" width="50%"|
 Janelle James – Abbott Elementary as Ava Coleman (ABC)'''
 D'Arcy Carden – Barry as Natalie Greer (HBO)
 Danielle Pinnock – Ghosts as Alberta Haynes (CBS)
 Kristen Schaal – What We Do in the Shadows as The Guide (FX)
 Sarah Goldberg – Barry as Sally Reed (HBO)
 Sheryl Lee Ralph – Abbott Elementary as Barbara Howard (ABC)
 Stephanie Beatriz – Brooklyn Nine-Nine as Rosa Diaz (NBC)
 Zazie Beetz – Atlanta as Van Keefer (FX)
|-
| valign="top" width="50%"|
 Bob Odenkirk – Better Call Saul as Jimmy McGill / Saul Goodman / Gene Takavic (AMC) Brian Cox – Succession as Logan Roy (HBO)
 Daveed Diggs – Snowpiercer as Andre Layton (TNT)
 Harold Perrineau – From as Boyd Stevens (Epix)
 Jeremy Strong – Succession as Kendall Roy (HBO)
 Kevin Costner – Yellowstone as John Dutton (Paramount Network)
 Milo Ventimiglia – This Is Us as Jack Pearson (NBC)
 Sterling K. Brown – This Is Us as Randall Pearson (NBC)
| valign="top" width="50%"|
 Melanie Lynskey – Yellowjackets as Shauna (Showtime) Freema Agyeman – New Amsterdam as Dr. Helen Sharpe (NBC)
 Jodie Comer – Killing Eve as Oksana Astankova / Villanelle (BBC America)
 Juliette Lewis – Yellowjackets as Natalie (Showtime)
 Kelly Reilly – Yellowstone as Beth Dutton (Paramount Network)
 Mandy Moore – This Is Us as Rebecca Pearson née Malone (NBC)
 Sandra Oh – Killing Eve as Eve Polastri (BBC America)
 Zendaya – Euphoria as Rue Bennett (HBO)
|-
| valign="top" width="50%"|
 Giancarlo Esposito – Better Call Saul as Gus Fring (AMC) Eric Dane – Euphoria as Cal Jacobs (HBO)
 Jonathan Banks – Better Call Saul as Mike Ehrmantraut (AMC)
 Jon Huertas – This Is Us as Miguel Rivas (NBC)
 Justin Hartley – This Is Us as Kevin Pearson (NBC)
 Kieran Culkin – Succession as Roman Roy (HBO)
 Matthew Macfadyen – Succession as Tom Wambsgans (HBO)
 Michael Mando – Better Call Saul as Nacho Varga (AMC)
| valign="top" width="50%"|
 Rhea Seehorn – Better Call Saul as Kim Wexler (AMC) Chrissy Metz – This Is Us as Kate Pearson (NBC)
 Christina Ricci – Yellowjackets as Misty (Showtime)
 J. Smith-Cameron – Succession as Gerri Kellman (HBO)
 Sandra Mae Frank – New Amsterdam as Dr. Elizabeth Wilder (NBC)
 Sarah Snook – Succession as Shiv Roy (HBO)
 Susan Kelechi Watson – This Is Us as Beth (Clarke) Pearson (NBC)
 Sydney Sweeney – Euphoria as Cassie Howard (HBO)
|-
| valign="top" width="50%"|
 Oscar Isaac – Scenes from a Marriage as Jonathan Levy (HBO) Ben Foster – The Survivor as Harry Haft (HBO)
 Bill Pullman – The Sinner as Harry Ambrose (USA Network)
 Daniel Radcliffe – Miracle Workers: Oregon Trail as Reverend Ezekiel Brown (TBS)
 Jon Bernthal – We Own This City as Sgt. Wayne Jenkins (HBO)
 Sean Penn – Gaslit as John N. Mitchell (Starz)
| valign="top" width="50%"|
 Sarah Paulson – American Crime Story: Impeachment as Linda Tripp (FX) Geraldine Viswanathan – Miracle Workers: Oregon Trail as Prudence Aberdeen (TBS)
 Jessica Chastain – Scenes from a Marriage as Mira Phillips (HBO)
 Julia Roberts – Gaslit as Martha Mitchell (Starz)
 Michelle Pfeiffer – The First Lady as Betty Ford (Showtime)
 Renée Zellweger – The Thing About Pam as Pam Hupp (NBC)
|-
| valign="top" width="50%"|
 Murray Bartlett – The White Lotus as Armond (HBO) Dan Stevens – Gaslit as John Dean (Starz)
 Josh Charles – We Own This City as Daniel Hersl (HBO)
 Josh Duhamel – The Thing About Pam as Joel Schwartz (NBC)
 Steve Buscemi – Miracle Workers: Oregon Trail as Benny the Teen (TBS)
 Steve Zahn – The White Lotus as Mark Mossbacher (HBO)
| valign="top" width="50%"|
 Jennifer Coolidge – The White Lotus as Tanya McQuoid (HBO) Alexandra Daddario – The White Lotus as Rachel Patton (HBO)
 Betty Gilpin – Gaslit as Mo Dean (Starz)
 Connie Britton – The White Lotus as Nicole Mossbacher (HBO)
 Judy Greer – The Thing About Pam as Leah Askey (NBC)
 Sydney Sweeney – The White Lotus as Olivia Mossbacher (HBO)
|}

Directing
Streaming

Broadcast Network / Cable

Writing
Streaming

Broadcast Network / Cable

Special Honorary Awards
 TV Breakout Star Award - Quinta Brunson
 TV Icon Award - Giancarlo Esposito
 Virtuoso Award - Mandy Moore
 Spotlight Award - As We See It
 Legacy Award''' - Star Trek: Strange New Worlds''

Most wins

Most nominations

See also
 6th Hollywood Critics Association Film Awards
 5th Hollywood Critics Association Midseason Film Awards
 1st Hollywood Critics Association Creative Arts Awards

References

TV Awards 02
2022 television awards
2022 awards in the United States